Pandurang Pundalik Fundkar (21 August 1950 – 31 May 2018), alias Bhausaheb Fundkar, was leader of opposition in Maharashtra Legislative Council in India. He was a leader of Bharatiya Janata Party.

He was a member of 9th Lok Sabha (1989-1991), 10th Lok Sabha (1991-1996) and 11th Lok Sabha from Akola from Maharashtra. He was also former president of State BJP. He was born in 1950 in Buldhana. 

He was elected as member of Maharashtra Vidhan Sabha from Khamgaon (Vidhan Sabha constituency) in 1978 and 1980. On July 8, 2016, he was sworn in as a Cabinet Minister in Devendra Fadnavis government.

He died on 31 May 2018 in Breach Candy hospital, Mumbai due to a massive heart attack.

References 

1950 births
2018 deaths
People from Maharashtra
People from Buldhana district
Marathi politicians
India MPs 1989–1991
India MPs 1991–1996
India MPs 1996–1997
Members of the Maharashtra Legislative Council
Maharashtra MLAs 1978–1980
Maharashtra MLAs 1980–1985
People from Akola district
Lok Sabha members from Maharashtra
Leaders of the Opposition in the Maharashtra Legislative Council
Bharatiya Janata Party politicians from Maharashtra